Kyösti is a Finnish male given name and a variant of Kustaa. Notable people with the name include:

Kyösti Haataja, twentieth century Finnish politician
Kyösti Kakkonen (born 1956), Finnish businessman, and art collector
Kyösti Kallio (1873–1940), fourth President of Finland (1937–1940)
Kyösti Karhila (born 1921), Finnish World War II fighter ace with 32 victories
Kyösti Karjalainen (born 1967), ice hockey player
Kyösti Karjula (born 1952), politician and member of the Finnish Parliament from Lumijoki
Kyösti Kylälä, Finnish railroad engineer and inventor from Helsingfors
Kyösti Laasonen (born 1945), Finnish archer
Kyösti Lehtonen (born 1931), Finnish wrestler and Olympic champion in Greco-Roman wrestling
Kyösti Luukko (1903–1970), Finnish wrestler and Olympic medalist
Kyösti Virrankoski (born 1944), Finnish politician and member of the European Parliament

See also 
 Kyöstilä